Back to Bacharach is a jazz/soft rock album by Steve Tyrell that was released in 2008 by Koch Records.

Track listing

Personnel

Musicians
 Darryl Tookes, Lauren Tyrell, Fred White, LaTanya Hall, Lynne Fiddmontvocals, background vocals
 Springhurst Elementary School Harmonairesvocals
 Bob Mannguitar, piano, Fender Rhodes piano, synthesizer
 Abe Appleman, Barry Finclair, Karl Kawahara, Anne Leathers, Shinwon Kim, Richard Sortomme, Carol Webb, Jonathan Dinklageviolin
 Karen Ritscher, Vince Liontiviola
 Semyon Fridman, Roger Shellcello
 Warren Lueningtrumpet, flugelhorn
 Herb Alperttrumpet
 Lew Soloff, Matt Fronkeflugelhorn
 Dave Bargeronbaritone horn
 Burt Bacharachpiano, keyboards
 Kenny Ascher, Quinn Johnsonpiano
 Guy Moonorgan
 Jon Allenkeyboards
 Allan Schwartzbergdrums, percussion
 John Guerindrums
 Dorian Holley, Patti Austinbackground vocals

Support
 Steve Tyrellliner note author
 Tina Tyrellphotographer
 Steve Tyrell, Bob Mann, Burt Bacharacharrangement
 Lawrence Azerradart direction, design
 Bill Schneemixing
 Darius Fongmixing assistant, Pro Tools engineer

References

Bibliography

See also
Album on Discogs

2008 albums
Soft rock albums by American artists
Steve Tyrell albums
Albums arranged by Burt Bacharach
Burt Bacharach tribute albums